Victor Joseph Auguste D'Hondt (20 November 1841 – 30 May 1901) was a Belgian lawyer and jurist of civil law at Ghent University. He devised a procedure, the D'Hondt method, which he first described in 1878, for allocating seats to candidates in party-list proportional representation elections. The method has been adopted by a number of countries, including Albania, Argentina, Armenia, Austria, Belgium, Bulgaria, Chile, Colombia, Croatia, Czech Republic, Denmark, Ecuador, Fiji, Finland, Israel, Japan, North Macedonia, the Netherlands, Northern Ireland, Paraguay, Poland, Portugal, Scotland, Slovenia, Serbia, Spain, Switzerland, Turkey, Iceland, Uruguay and Wales. A modified D'Hondt system is used for elections to the London Assembly and the Scottish Parliament.

Victor D’Hondt was an influential proponent of proportional representation in Belgium. He published several articles on proportional representation and was founding member of the Association Réformiste Belge pour l'Adoption de la Representation Proportionnelle in 1881. From 1885 he served as professor of civil and fiscal law at the University of Ghent. In 1896 he was awarded the title  Officer in the Belgian Order of Leopold.

Publications 
 Question électorale. La représentation proportionnelle des partis. Bruxelles, 1878.
 Système pratique et raisonné de représentation proportionnelle. Bruxelles, 1882.
 Formule du minimum dans la représentation proportionnelle. In Représentation proportionnelle—Revue mensuelle 2, pages 117–130, 1883
 Exposé du système pratique de représentation proportionnelle adopté par le Comité de l’Association Réformiste Belge. Gand, 1885.

References

Further reading 

 
 
 

1841 births
19th-century Belgian lawyers
Academic staff of Ghent University
1901 deaths